National Institute of Cryptology Research and Development (NICRD) is a national-level research center for cryptologic education and research.

History 
The institute was established in 2007 at Hyderabad. It is one of the institutes which comes under the purview of National Technical Research Organisation. The other one is National Critical Information Infrastructure Protection Centre.

It was envisioned to house simulation laboratories, digital fortress laboratories for financial security and design. And, to develop encryption products for national security-related critical applications.

References 

Cyber Security in India
Cryptologic education
Computer security organizations
Indian intelligence agencies